Toledo High School, also known as Toledo Junior/Senior High School, is a public high school in Toledo, Oregon, United States.

Academics
In 2008, 73% of the school's seniors received a high school diploma. Of 100 students, 73 graduated, 17 dropped out, four received a modified diploma, and six remained in high school in 2009.

References

High schools in Lincoln County, Oregon
Public middle schools in Oregon
Public high schools in Oregon
1959 establishments in Oregon